The 2015 Southern Conference softball tournament was held at Jim Frost Stadium on the campus of Chattanooga University in Chattanooga, Tennessee, from May 6 through May 9, 2015.   won their eight tournament championship and earned the SoCon's automatic bid to the 2015 NCAA Division I softball tournament. The Championship game was broadcast on ESPN3 while all other games were broadcast on the SoCon Digital Network.

Format
The SoCon Tournament takes the top 7 teams and places them in a double elimination tournament, up until the championship. Seed 1 gets a bye to the 2nd Round. The championship game is played with a winner-take-all single game format. Jason Patterson and Phil Cox will call all the games for the SoCon Digital Network. Darren Goldwater and Stephanie Cushing will call the championship for ESPN3.

Tournament

References

Southern Conference Tournament
Southern Conference softball tournament